DW5 may refer to:

Dragon Quest V: Hand of the Heavenly Bride
Dynasty Warriors 5